A fatbike (also called fat bike, fat tire, fat-tire bike, or snow bike) is an off-road bicycle built to accommodate oversized tyres, typically  or larger and rims  or wider, designed for low ground pressure to allow riding on soft, unstable terrain, such as snow, sand, bogs and mud. Fatbikes are built around frames with wide forks and stays to accommodate the space required to fit these wide rims and tires. Fatbikes were developed for use in snow or sand, but are capable of traversing diverse terrain types including snow, sand, desert, bogs, mud, pavement, or traditional mountain biking trails.

History

Early versions of fat-tired bikes were probably built as long ago as the early 1900s but modern versions were not developed until the 1980s. An early example is the custom three-wheeled in-line longtail-style bike with fat tires, designed by French cyclist Jean Naud in 1980 for desert travel. He rode it from Zinder in Niger to Tamanrasset in Algeria, and later rode a similar bike in 1986 across the Sahara using prototype fat tires from Michelin.

In the late 1980s, Alaskan frame builders began experimenting with custom components and configurations designed to achieve a large contact patch of tire on snow. Steve Baker, with Icycle Bicycles in Anchorage, was welding together two rims and even three rims and built several special frames and forks that could accommodate two or three tires together. In 1989, Dan Bull, Mark Frise, Roger Cowles and Les Matz, rode the  length of the Iditarod trail.

Simultaneously, in New Mexico, Ray Molina had commissioned Remolino  rims,  tires, and frames to fit them. He wanted the bikes for his guided tour business in the soft sands of the Mexican and Southwest arroyos and dunes. Mark Gronewald, owner of Wildfire Designs Bicycles in Palmer, Alaska, met Molina at the 1999 Interbike convention in Las Vegas and rode one of Molina's prototypes at demo days. In late 1999, Gronewald and another Alaskan frame builder, John Evingson, collaborated to design and build several bikes using Molina's rims and tires. Gronewald and Evingson then began producing their own separate lines of fat-tired bikes in 2000. Rims and tires were imported to Alaska where Wildfire and Evingson began making small, handmade production runs and custom-ordered frames built around Remolino  rims and  tires. Gronewald coined the trademark "Fat Bike" in 2001 and used it as the model name for his bikes. Gronewald initially worked with Palmer Machinery for welding and later contracted frame building to Mike DeSalvo at DeSalvo Cyles of Ashland, Oregon. Gronewald continued to sell his original fatbikes until 2011. Gronewald's design featured an  offset wheel and frame built to allow full range gearing, since he was using standard hubs and bottom brackets available at the time.

Wildfire and Evingson bikes were used in the Iditarod Trail races beginning in 2000. Also that year, Mike Curiak from Colorado set a record on the Iditarod Trail in the IditaSport Extreme race to Nome on a modified Marin bike with Remolino rims and tires. Surly Bikes released the Pugsley frame, in 2005, and began producing Large Marge  rims and Endomorph  tires in 2006. The Pugsley frame, rim and tire offerings made fatbikes commercially available in local bike shops worldwide. The Pugsley bikes also featured the offset wheel and frame build.

Other early versions of the fatbike were normal mountain bikes equipped with SnowCat rims, created by Simon Rakower of All-Weather Sports in Fairbanks, Alaska, in the early 1990s; or with multiple tires seated on two or three standard rims that had been welded or pinned together. Rakower was involved with technical support aspects of the Iditabike (later IditaSport) race, which started in 1987. Since 2002 the race continued on the same trail under the name Iditarod Trail Invitational (ITI). Rakower started hand making extra wide rims for participants by welding two rims together and cutting off the middle ridge known as the snowcat rims . S. Rakower produced those rims from 1991 through 1999. Many riders on the Iditarod Trail used a Geax tire with the snow cat rim. Enthusiasts would cut and sew tire-carcasses together to maximize the size of the tire and utilize all the available space between the seat stays and chain stays; this tire and rim combination would maximize the bicycle's footprint, increasing flotation on winter trails.  Soon after, Rakower decided to design a  rim from scratch and had it produced. SnowCats revolutionized winter cycling, as they could be fitted to nearly any commercially available mountain bike.

Mike Curiak from Colorado set a record on the Iditarod Trail in the 2000 race to Nome.

Products
Surly Bikes released the Pugsley frame in 2005 and began producing Large Marge  rims and Endomorph  tires in 2006. The Pugsley frame, rim, and tire offering made fatbikes commercially available in local bike shops worldwide. The Pugsley bikes also featured the offset wheel and frame build. Fatback Bikes came online in 2007 adding the carbon Corvus fatbike. Another Alaskan brand 9:zero:7 joined in 2010 also offering a carbon fatbike. Other bike manufacturers have also entered the fatbike market recently including Trek, with the Farley, Salsa with the Beargrease and Mukluk, and Specialized with the Fatboy and On=One with the Fatty. Others followed since 2014 Rocky Mountain, Felt, Kona, Pivot and many more.  Since 2014, Dorel Sports has utilized their Mongoose brand to make fatbikes even more accessible to the general public, with models such as the Beast, Dolomite, Hitch, and Malus selling for around $250, considerably less than their higher-priced predecessors.

Events
As the popularity of fatbikes has expanded, fatbike specific events (races, race series, tours, and festivals) have emerged. Examples include the Snow Bike Festival, the annual Global Fatbike Summit (since 2012), the Fatbike Birkie race which is part of the Great Lakes Fatbike Series (2014–2015 season: 8 races held across 3 states),  the US Open Fatbike Beach Championships (inaugural, 2015), the USA Cycling Fat Bike National Championship (inaugural, 2015), the Ontario-based Substance Projects OnFatbikeSeries (OFBS), the 45Nrth Fatbike Triple Crown race series and the UK Fatbike Championships (inaugural, 2013).

The Iditarod Trail Invitational (formerly known as Iditabike and Iditasport Extreme and Iditasport Impossible) race in Alaska has grown into an international event offering an extreme ,  and  distances. The event spurred the creation of many other winter ultra events in the United States, Canada and Europe that are accepted qualifiers to get into this Invitational.

A number of extreme expeditions have also been made on fatbikes. In December 2012 Eric Larsen attempted to ride a fatbike to the South Pole, but made it only a quarter of the way before he had to turn around. Maria Leijerstam became the first to cycle to the South Pole, across the South Pole Traverse road on a tricycle with fatbike tires.

Popular fatbiking destinations are predominantly found in the northern latitudes of the United States, Canada, and some Nordic countries.

Gallery

See also
 Antarctica Cycling Expeditions
 Outline of cycling
 Electric bicycle
 Mountain bike
 [Bicis fatbike]

References

 

Cycle types
Mountain biking
Off-road vehicles